Cape Oscar (Mys Oskara) is a headland on the western shore of the Taymyr Peninsula in the Kara Sea, Russian Federation. This cape is located at the northern tip of the Oscar Peninsula, between the Taymyr Gulf and Toll Bay.

Administratively Cape Oscar is part of the Taymyrsky Dolgano-Nenetsky District of Krasnoyarsk Krai.

References

External links 
 A Tsarist Attempt at Opening the Northern Sea Route

Oscar
Oscar